The Hersbruck–Pommelsbrunn railway is a 5.4 km long mainline railway in the German state of Bavaria, which connects the Nuremberg–Cheb and Nuremberg–Schwandorf lines to each other.

History 

Iron ore was long mined in the Auerbach area. The Hersbruck–Pommelsbrunn link was built by the Bavarian State Railways for the carriage of this ore to the former Maxhütte steelworks in Sulzbach-Rosenberg and it was opened on 15 October 1877.

Route
The line begins at Hersbruck (rechts Pegnitz) station and runs in an easterly direction parallel with the two-track Nuremberg–Cheb line to a level crossing with the road connecting Hersbruck and Hohenstadt. It then climbs a ramp onto an embankment and turn at the beginning of the village of Hohenstadt to the southeast, first crossing the Pegnitz and then federal highway B14 and meets the Nuremberg–Schwandorf line at Pommelsbrunn depot, a former station, now without passenger facilities.

Operations 
The connecting line is now used by Regional-Express services on the Nuremberg–Hersbruck (rechts Pegnitz)–Neukirchen (b. Sulzbach-Rosenberg)–Neustadt an der Waldnaab / Schwandorf routes. These run from Nuremberg to Hersbruck on the Right Pegnitz line with some trains to Bayreuth and Marktredwitz uncoupled in Hersbruck. Diesel multiple units of class 610 (Pendolino) and 612 (RegioSwinger tilting trains) are used on the line.

References

Railway lines in Bavaria
Railway lines opened in 1877
1877 establishments in Bavaria
Buildings and structures in Nürnberger Land